The 1983 UC Davis football team represented the University of California, Davis as a member of the Northern California Athletic Conference (NCAC) during the 1983 NCAA Division II football season. Led by 14th-year head coach Jim Sochor, UC Davis compiled an overall record of 11–1 with a mark of 6–0 in conference play, winning the NCAC title for the 13th consecutive season. 1983 was the team's 14th consecutive winning season. With the 6–0 conference record, the team stretched their conference winning streak to 15 games dating back to the 1981 season. The Aggies were ranked No. 1 in the NCAA Division II polls for the last three weeks of the regular season. They advanced to the NCAA Division II Football Championship playoffs for the second straight year, where they beat  in the quarterfinals before losing to eventual national champion North Dakota State in the semifinals. The team outscored its opponents 380 to 94 for the season. The Aggies played home games at Toomey Field in Davis, California.

Schedule

NFL Draft
The following UC Davis Aggies players were selected in the 1984 NFL Draft.

References

UC Davis
UC Davis Aggies football seasons
Northern California Athletic Conference football champion seasons
UC Davis Aggies football